"A Nice Cup of Tea" is an essay by English author George Orwell, first published in the London Evening Standard on 12 January 1946. It is a discussion of the craft of making a cup of tea, including the line: "Here are my own eleven rules, every one of which I regard as golden."

Orwell wrote that "tea is one of the mainstays of civilisation in this country and causes violent disputes over how it should be made", and his rules cover such matters as the best shape for a teacup, the advisability of using water that is still boiling, and his preference for very strong tea. He also considers what he calls "one of the most controversial points of all" – whether to put tea in the cup first and add the milk after, or the other way around, acknowledging, "indeed in every family in Britain there are probably two schools of thought on the subject". Orwell says tea should be poured first because "one can exactly regulate the amount of milk whereas one is liable to put in too much milk if one does it the other way round". "I maintain that my own argument is unanswerable", he writes.

See also 
Bibliography of George Orwell
ISO 3103
Tea classics
Tea in the United Kingdom

References

External links
 A Nice Cup of Tea: original essay published by The Orwell Foundation

Essays by George Orwell
1946 essays
Tea culture
Works originally published in the London Evening Standard
Tea in the United Kingdom